The Gunlom Falls, formerly Waterfall Creek Falls, is a cascading waterfall on the Waterfall Creek located in the Kakadu National Park in the Northern Territory, Australia. The falls are also known as UDP Falls and are perhaps most famous for making an appearance in the movie Crocodile Dundee.

Location and features

Depending on the time of the year, the Gunlom Falls range from a roaring waterfall to a gentle trickle falling down the cliffs. This plunge pool at the bottom of the falls is one of the most visited places in the Kakadu National Park and a popular swimming hole.

A steep 15-minute climb leads to the top of the falls, with views over the southern region of the park. There is also a series of swimming holes at the top of the falls. During the wet season (December to April), access is restricted. There is also a campground located near the falls.

The nearest accommodation is Cooinda Lodge, about two hours away in a vehicle, but there is a large public campground with hot showers and flushing toilets at the falls.

Walking track closure
, the walking track to the lookout and pools above the falls is closed at the request of the Jawoyn traditional owners. It was closed before mid-2019, due to an investigation by the Aboriginal Areas Protection Authority (AAPA) into Parks Australia under the Northern Territory Aboriginal Sacred Sites Act 1989 (NT). The traditional owners allege that, in the process of upgrading the track, Parks Australia may have damaged a sacred site near the track. The matter was due to go before the court on 30 April 2021, but a request made by Parks Australia resulted in an adjournment. Parts of Gunlom remain closed.

See also

References

External links

Waterfalls of the Northern Territory
Kakadu National Park
Cascade waterfalls